The Kaouat mine is a large iron mine located in central Mauritania in the Adrar Region. Kaouat represents one of the largest iron ore reserves in Mauritania and in the world having estimated reserves of 1.2 billion tonnes of ore grading 44% iron metal.

References 

Iron mines in Mauritania